Zarabad District is a district (bakhsh) in Konarak County, Sistan and Baluchestan province, Iran. At the 2006 census, its population was 15,492, in 3,360 families.  The district has no cities. The district has two rural districts (dehestan): Zarabad-e Gharbi Rural District and Zarabad-e Sharqi Rural District.

References 

Konarak County
Districts of Sistan and Baluchestan Province